Dimitris Avramopoulos is a Greek politician of the conservative New Democracy party, and former career diplomat. He has served in various high-level cabinet posts, including Minister for Foreign Affairs and Minister for National Defence, and was Mayor of Athens in 1995–2002. He served as EU Commissioner for Migration, Home Affairs and Citizenship in the Juncker Commission between 2014 and 2019.

Personal life
Avramopoulos was born in Athens in 1953, into a family which had originally come from Ilia and Elliniko in Arcadia. He served his 26 months military service from 1978 to 1980 in the Hellenic Air Force.

He is married to Vivian, with whom he has two sons, Filippos and Iasonas. Apart from his native Greek, he speaks English, French and Italian fluently.

Diplomatic career
In 1980, Avramopoulos joined the Ministry of Foreign Affairs in Athens, where he worked until 1993. From 1988 to 1992, he served as  Greek Consul to Belgium in Liège. At the same time he was a Special Adviser to Konstantinos Mitsotakis, President and Leader of the New Democracy. During this time he also represented Greece in Vienna at the Conference for Security and Co-operation in Europe. In 1992 he became official spokesman of the Greek Ministry of Foreign Affairs and was appointed Consul General of Greece in Geneva. In 1993 he was promoted to director of the Prime Minister of Greece's Diplomatic Office.

Political career

Mayor of Athens
In 1993, Avramopoulos resigned from Greek diplomatic service to enter parliamentary politics as a member of New Democracy and was elected a member of its Central Committee. From 1993 to 1994 he served as a Member of the Hellenic Parliament. In 1994 he was elected Mayor of Athens, and was re-elected in October 1998 in a historic first-round landslide victory. From 1995 to 1999 he served as chairman of the Central Union of Local Authorities of Greece.

In 1995 he founded the “Permanent Conference of the Mayors of the Capitals of South-East Europe” and served as its first President. From 1996 to 2000 he served as vice-president of the executive committee of the International Union of Local Authorities (IULA) and from 1997 to 2002, as a member of the Committee of the Regions of the European Union. Elected as president of the Summit Conference of the Mayors of the World in 2000, he served until 2002, during which time he founded the "World Union of Olympic Cities", "Athens’ International Prize for Democracy", and “World Institute of Global and Cities’ Diplomacy”, Rome.

Ministerial posts
In March 2001, he split from New Democracy with his Movement of Free Citizens (KEP), but in a surprising move merged back in June 2002. When in 2004 New Democracy won the parliamentary elections, Avramopoulos was appointed Minister of Tourism, serving until 2006, and afterwards, from 2006 until 2009, as Minister of Health and Social Solidarity.

In the October 2009 election, Avramopoulos was re-elected to the Hellenic Parliament representing the constituency of Athens A. After the election of Antonis Samaras to the “New Democracy” Party Presidency he was appointed President of the Organizing Committee of the 8th Party Congress held at Athens in June 2010. In July 2010, he became Vice-President of “New Democracy”, serving until 1 November 2014.

On 11 November 2011 he was appointed Minister for National Defence in the coalition government of Lucas Papademos, resigning from his parliamentary seat, thus adhering to the New Democracy policy that no serving Opposition Party Deputies may hold ministerial office.

At the 6 May 2012 election, Avramopoulos was returned as Deputy for Athens A, being re-elected in the 17 June 2012 general election. On 21 June 2012 he was appointed Minister for Foreign Affairs. After the Cabinet reshuffle of 25 June 2013 he became Greek Minister for Defence again, serving until his nomination as Greece's European Commissioner in November 2014.

European Commissioner for Migration and Home Affairs

On 27 July 2014, Prime Minister Antonis Samaras nominated Avramopoulos as Greece's next member of the European Commission. Before the nomination, Dora Bakoyiannis was widely seen to be a strong contender for the Commission post. Samaras also defied calls from the centre-left Pasok party for Maria Damanaki to continue as European Commissioner.

Jean-Claude Juncker then nominated Avramopoulos as European Commissioner for Migration and Home Affairs. In this capacity, Avramopoulos shares competency over cyber-security matters with Günther Oettinger.

In the aftermath of the victory of the left-wing SYRIZA party in the 25 January election in 2015, Avramopoulos' name was widely circulated in Greek media as the most likely choice for SYRIZA's candidate in the second round of the election for the Presidency of Greece. According to the Greek media reports, the nomination would be seen both as a gesture of conciliation with the right, but would crucially also enable SYRIZA to nominate its own European Commissioner. On 30 January Samaras phoned Avramopoulos and assured him that New Democracy would support his eventual nomination.

Avramopoulos criticized the 2019 Turkish offensive into north-eastern Syria. He said that "the European Union remains committed to the unity, sovereignty and territorial integrity of the Syrian state".

Other positions
From the outset of his political career, Avramopoulos served for twenty years as Honorary President of the Athens’ International Prize for Democracy for UNESCO in Paris (until 2013). He has also been Chairman of the Steering Committee on Cities´ Diplomacy, established by the Global Forum (Rome) and the World Bank Institute (Washington D.C.). He was elected President of the “World Institute of Global and Cities’ Diplomacy”, an independent NGO based in Rome as well as Executive President of the “World Union of Olympic Cities”, an Olympic Games NGO.

Greek-Turkish rapprochement
Avramopoulos has a friendly relation with the Turkish President Recep Tayyip Erdoğan since they were Mayors of Athens and Istanbul respectively. He is deemed one of the main proponents of Greek-Turkish rapprochement.
Also this year the two former Mayors came together to discuss topics regarding Migration, Borders and Security on European and EU-level in Istanbul on 3 June 2019.
On the same day, Avramopoulos also met with Turkish Interior Minister Süleyman Soylu to discuss about the same topic.

Academic degrees
Avramopoulos read Public Law and Political Science at Athens University Law School, graduating with the degree of Bachelor of Arts (BA).
He then undertook postgraduate studies receiving a Master's degree in European Studies at the Institute of European Affairs, Université libre de Bruxelles.
He has been conferred honorary doctorates by Adelphi University (Long Island, New York), Deree College (Athens), Drexel University (Philadelphia) and Kingston University (London), and has been elected Honorary Professor of Peking University (Beijing) and of the European College of Parma (Italy).

Honours
Avramopoulos has received numerous honors from European States as well as many countries around the world for his diplomatic, public and charitable service:

 Grand Cross, Order of the Phoenix (Greece)

 Grand Cross, Order of Civil Merit (Spain)

 Grand Cross, Order of the Crown (Belgium)

 Grand Cross, Order of Leopold II (Belgium)

 Grand Cross, Order of the Polar Star (Sweden)

 Grand Cross, Order of the Lion (Finland)

 Grand Cross, Order of Merit (Portugal)

 1st Class, Order of the White Star (Estonia)

 Commander, Order of Merit (Poland)

 Commandeur de l’Ordre de la Couronne de Chêne (Luxembourg)

 Grand Decoration, Honour for Services to the Republic (Austria)

 Companion, National Order of Merit (Malta)

 Officer, Legion d'Honneur (France)

 Officer, Order of Merit (Luxembourg)

 Knight, National Order of Merit (France)

 Commander, Order of Merit (Germany)

 Grand Cordon, National Order of the Cedar (Lebanon)

 1st Class, Order for Civil Merit (Bulgaria)

 Knight, Order of Makarios III (Cyprus)

 Grand Cross, Order of Diego de Losada (Venezuela)

 1st Class, Order of the Star (Yugoslavia)

And, from the Ecumenical Orthodox Patriarchate of Constantinople, the Patriarchate of Jerusalem and the Patriarchate of Alexandria:
 Grand Cross, Order of the Holy Sepulchre
 Grand Cross, Order of the Apostle and Evangelist Mark
 Grand Cross, Order of Saints George and Constantine.

Distinctions and awards
Avramopoulos received, in 2006, the “Vincitore Assoluto” Award of the Premio Internazionale “Giuseppe Sciacca”, and has been presented with distinctions by many foreign Cities and Municipalities: Famagusta, Barcelona, Beijing, Beirut, Berlin, Boston, Brooklyn N.Y., Bucharest, Caracas, Chicago, Crotone, Florence, Genoa, Jakarta, Havana, Istanbul, Kyiv, Ljubljana, Los Angeles, Miami -Florida, Massachusetts, Montreal, Moscow, New Jersey, New York, Nicosia, Paris, Philadelphia, Providence, Rhode Island, Rome, Sofia, State of Illinois, Sydney, Tbilisi, Tirana, Toronto, Valletta, Washington D.C., Xian, Yerevan. He has been honoured with the Honorary Freedom of 40 Greek and foreign cities. In November 2017, he became Honorary Member of the Propeller Club of the United States Port of Piraeus and he received the Award of Excellence of the Propeller Club of the United States Port of Piraeus for his strenuous effort and impact on developing a new European Policy on regular Migration. In December 2017, the Department of International and European Studies of the University of Piraeus awarded Mr. Avramopoulos the first "Themistocles" prize for his contribution to the management of the EU migration and security crisis.

References

External links

 New Democracy website
 Greek Parliament site
 Dimitris Avramopoulos site
 www.elections2014.eu

|-

|-

|-

|-

|-

|-

|-

|-

1953 births
Commanders Crosses of the Order of Merit of the Federal Republic of Germany
Foreign ministers of Greece
Greek diplomats
Greek European Commissioners
Greek MPs 2004–2007
Greek MPs 2007–2009
Greek MPs 2009–2012
Greek MPs 2012 (May)
Greek MPs 2012–2014
Living people
Mayors of Athens
Ministers of National Defence of Greece
National and Kapodistrian University of Athens alumni
New Democracy (Greece) politicians
Politicians from Athens
Recipients of the Order of the Phoenix (Greece)
European Commissioners 2014–2019
Health ministers of Greece